Ian Richard Smith is an Australian businessman, corporate advisor and former journalist. He is a founder of the firm Bespoke Approach, and is considered by The Power Index to be one of Australia's most influential political lobbyists.

Career 
Smith's first job in Australia was as a reporter for the Wagga Wagga Daily Advertiser. He later transferred to The Advertiser in Adelaide, for which he continues to write occasional opinion editorial pieces and provide political commentary. He founded the firm Bespoke Approach in 2008, and solicited former Federal politicians Alexander Downer and Nick Bolkus to become partners. The firm's fourth partner is Andrew Butcher, a former spokesperson for Rupert Murdoch. Smith modeled the business on the way that the Kissingers, Albrights and Scowcrofts lobbied in the USA. Smith has worked as a media adviser for the Liberal party in South Australia and to former Victorian Premier Jeff Kennett. He is a former CEO of public relations firm, Gavin Anderson & Co, one of the largest in Australia. In 2011 Smith was listed on Crikey's The Power Index as one of Australia's ten most influential political lobbyists.

Smith is a former member of the Committee for Melbourne and advocated for the establishment of the Committee for Adelaide in South Australia on which he now sits. Smith's other advisory group and board memberships include The Big Issue, the Association of Australian Medical Research Institutes the Northern Territory Government’s Economic Development Panel and Developing East Arnhem Land Ltd. The latter company was established by the Northern Territory government, the Commonwealth government and mining company Rio Tinto to drive economic development in East Arnhem Land. As of 2015, Smith is also the United Kingdom’s Honorary Consul in South Australia.

In November 2015, Smith was scheduled to appear on the ABC TV talk show, Q&A.

Not-for-profit sector 

In mid-2015 Smith co-founded Barefoot to Boots with Awer G. Bul (brother of football player Awer Mabil), an organisation which helps refugees by "providing them with simple things that are otherwise inaccessible" to boost their resilience and help them to develop new skills.

He is also an Ambassador for LivingPositive, an organisation which aims to remove the stigma surrounding people living with HIV:AIDS. He is also Ambassador for the Orangutan Project which works on the protection of orangutans in Indonesia. Smith is also chair of Jirrawun Arts, an Indigenous arts organisation in the East Kimberley.

Personal life 
Smith was born in Epsom, Surrey, England and emigrated to Australia after visiting as a backpacker in the 1980s. He is married to former leader of the Australian Democrats, Natasha Stott Despoja and lives in Adelaide, South Australia.

References 

Australian lobbyists
Living people
Australian businesspeople
Year of birth missing (living people)